Eupithecia unitaria is a moth in the family Geometridae. It is found in Spain and North Africa.

Subspecies
Eupithecia unitaria unitaria
Eupithecia unitaria desertorum Dietze, 1910

References

Moths described in 1852
unitaria
Moths of Europe
Moths of Africa